General Merrill may refer to:

Dana T. Merrill (1876–1957), U.S. Army brigadier general
Frank Merrill (1903–1955), U.S. Army brigadier general
Lewis Merrill (1834–1896), Union Army brevet brigadier general